The 1928–29 season was the 55th season of competitive football by Rangers.

Overview

Results
All results are written with Rangers' score first.

Scottish League Division One

Scottish Cup

Appearances

See also
 1928–29 in Scottish football
 1928–29 Scottish Cup
 Glasgow Dental Hospital Cup

Scottish football championship-winning seasons
Rangers F.C. seasons
Rangers